Yezovo is a rural locality (a village) in Bogorodskoye Rural Settlement, Ust-Kubinsky  District, Vologda Oblast, Russia. The population was 17 as of 2002.

Geography 
Yezovo is located 75 km northwest of Ustye (the district's administrative centre) by road. Ugol is the nearest rural locality.

References 

Rural localities in Tarnogsky District